This is a list of the longest rivers on Earth.

Definition of length
There are many factors, such as the identification of the source, the identification or the definition of the mouth, and the scale of measurement of the river length between source and mouth, that determine the precise meaning of "river length". As a result, the length measurements of many rivers are only approximations (see also coastline paradox). In particular, there seems to exist disagreement as to whether the Nile or the Amazon is the world's longest river. The Nile has traditionally been considered longer, but in 2007 and 2008 some scientists claimed that the Amazon is longer by measuring the river plus the adjacent Pará estuary and the longest connecting tidal canal. A peer-reviewed article published 2009 in the International Journal of Digital Earth concludes that the Nile is longer.

Even when detailed maps are available, the length measurement is not always clear. A river may have multiple channels, or anabranches. The length may depend on whether the center or the edge of the river is measured. It may not be clear how to measure the length through a lake or reservoir. Seasonal and annual changes may alter both rivers and lakes. Other factors that can change the length of a river include cycles of erosion and flooding, dams, levees, and channelization. In addition, the length of meanders can change significantly over time due to natural or artificial cutoffs, when a new channel cuts across a narrow strip of land, bypassing a large river bend.

These points make it difficult, if not impossible, to get an accurate measurement of the length of a river. The varying accuracy and precision also makes it difficult to make length comparisons between different rivers without a degree of uncertainty.

List of river systems longer than 1,000 km

One should take the aforementioned discussion into account when using the data in the following table. For most rivers, different sources provide conflicting information on the length of a river system. The information in different sources is between parentheses.

Notes
When the length of a river is followed by an asterisk, it is an average of multiple information sources. If the difference in lengths between given information sources is significant, all lengths are listed. But if the lengths from secondary information sources are similar, they are averaged and that figure has an asterisk.
Scientists debate whether the Amazon or the Nile is the longest river in the world. Traditionally, the Nile is considered longer, but recent information suggests that the Amazon may be longer. Differences in the recorded length of the Amazon mainly depend on whether the course south of the Ilha de Marajó at the Amazon's mouth is to be treated as part of the Amazon, or as part of the separate Tocantins River. New evidence, (dated 16 June 2007) obtained from a high-altitude scientific venture in the Andes, claims that "the Amazon is longer than the Nile by 100 km, with its longest headwater being the Carhuasanta stream originating in the south of Peru on the Nevado Mismi mountain's northern slopes and flowing into the Río Apurímac". However, the origin of the river at Nevado Mismi had already been known more than one decade earlier (see Jacek Palkiewicz), and satellite based measuring from this origin to the Amazon mouth has resulted in not more than 6,400 km.
Generally, the most commonly used/anglicised name of the river is used. The name in a native language or alternate spelling may be shown.

River systems that may have existed in the past

Amazon–Congo
The Amazon basin formerly drained westwards into the Pacific Ocean, until the Andes rose and reversed the drainage.

The Congo basin is completely surrounded by high land, except for its long narrow exit valley past Kinshasa, including waterfalls around Manyanga. That gives the impression that most of the Congo basin was formerly on a much higher land level and that the Congo River was rejuvenated by much of its lower course being removed, likeliest when Africa split from South America when Gondwanaland broke up due to continental drift, and before that, the Congo would likely have flowed into the Amazon, producing a river around 6000 miles or 10,000 km long.

West Siberian Glacial Lake drainage

Its longest headwater was the Selenga river of Mongolia: it drained through ice-dammed lakes and the Aral Sea and the Caspian Sea to the Black Sea.

Lobourg
During the last glacial maximum, much of what is now the southern part of the North Sea was land, known to archaeologists as Doggerland. At this time, the Thames, the Meuse, the Scheldt, and the Rhine probably joined before flowing into the sea, in a system known by palaeogeographers as the Loubourg or Lobourg River System. There is some debate as to whether this river would have flowed southwest into what is now the English Channel, or flowed north, emerging into the North Sea close to modern Yorkshire. Current scientific research favours the former opinion, with the Thames and Rhine meeting in a large lake, the outflow of which was close to the present-day Straits of Dover.

See also
 Lists of rivers
 List of drainage basins by area
 List of rivers by discharge
 List of river films and television series

Notes and references
Notes

References

External links
 Principal Rivers of the World

Length
Rivers